Hamidullah Amin (born 1941) is an Afghan politician from Bagrami District, Kabul Province, was serving as the chancellor of Kabul University from 2008 to 2016. He also worked at the university prior to fleeing Afghanistan in 1988.

Amin completed his M.A. in geography at Durham University in 1968, entitled The role of communication in the development of Afghanistan. He returned to Afghanistan to work for Kabul University, as well as serving as a visiting lecturer at the University of Nebraska at Omaha. During this time he published his most influential English language work, A Geography of Afghanistan. and remained after the Soviet invasion. He eventually fled in 1988, and worked for 14 years at Macquarie University in Australia, before returning to Kabul to become Chancellor. During his time, Amin has worked to increase the number of female students at the university, and in higher education in Afghanistan in general.

He is fluent in Pashto, Dari, English and Urdu.

References

External links 
 Official biography

Academic staff of Kabul University
Pashtun people
20th-century geographers
1941 births
Living people
21st-century geographers
Alumni of Durham University Graduate Society